The Men's individual competition at the 2017 World Championships was held on 16 February 2017.

Results
The race was started at 14:30.

References

Men's individual